Mozhaysky District is a territorial division (a district, or raion) in Western Administrative Okrug, one of the 125 in the federal city of Moscow, Russia. It is located in the west of the federal city. As of the 2010 Census, the total population of the district was 132,373. Mozhaysky District takes its name after Mozhayskoe Highway, the district's major road, which in turn was named after the old Mozhayskaya road which lead to Mozhaysk town, located 110 kilometers (68 mi) to the west of Moscow, which was protecting west approach routes to Moscow since 13th century.

From 1 July, 2012, the district also includes the territory of the Skolkovo Innovation Center.

As a municipal division, the district is incorporated as Mozhaysky Municipal Okrug.

Education
Moscow Korean School (MKS; 모스크바한국학교), a South Korean international school, is within the district. It is the only European school certified by the South Korean government.

References

Notes

Sources

Districts of Moscow